Karel Schulz (6 May 1899 – 27 February 1943) was a Czech novelist, theatre critic, poet and short story writer, whose best known work is the historical novel Stone and Pain (1942).

Work 
 Kámen a bolest (Stone and pain) (1942) – historical novel, biography of Michelangelo Buonarroti
 Papežská mše (Popes' Mess)(1943) – incomplete second volume

See also 
 List of Czech writers

References 

1899 births
1943 deaths
People from Městec Králové
People from the Kingdom of Bohemia
Czech novelists
Czech male novelists
Czech poets
Czech male poets
20th-century Czech poets
20th-century Czech novelists
20th-century male writers